Scott Baker may refer to:
Scott Baker (marine biologist) (born 1954), American specialist in conservation genetics of whale, dolphins and porpoises
Scott Baker (right-handed pitcher) (born 1981), American professional baseball pitcher
Scott Baker (left-handed pitcher) (born 1970), American left-handed baseball pitcher
Scott Baker (racing driver) (1957–2000), American stock car racer 
Scott Baker (judge) (born 1937), British Lord Justice of Appeal
Scott Baker (writer) (born 1947), American writer of fantasy, horror, & science fiction; also a translator from the French
Scott Baker (journalist) (born 1964), American editor of The Blaze
Scott Thompson Baker (born 1960), American television actor
Scott Baker (darts player) (born 1986), English darts player